, provisional designation: , is a large centaur from the outer Solar System, approximately  in diameter. It was discovered on 14 July 2010 by astronomers with the Pan-STARRS-1 survey at Haleakala Observatory, Hawaii, in the United States. According to American astronomer Michael Brown, it is "possibly" a dwarf planet. The minor planet was numbered in 2018 and has not been named.

Orbit and classification 

 is a member of the centaurs, an inward-moving population of bodies transiting from the Kuiper belt to the group of Jupiter-family comets. Their eccentric orbits are often in between those of Jupiter and Neptune, that is, they have a semi-major axis of typically 5.5 to 30.1 AU. Centaurs are cometary-like bodies. They have a short dynamical lifetime due to the perturbing forces exerted on them by the Solar System's outer planets.

It orbits the Sun at a distance of 11.2–35.1 AU once every 111 years and 4 months (40,670 days; semi-major axis of 23.15 AU). Its orbit has an eccentricity of 0.52 and an inclination of 20° with respect to the ecliptic. The body's observation arc begins with its official discovery observation in July 2010.

Numbering and naming 

This minor planet was numbered by the Minor Planet Center on 25 September 2018, receiving the number  in the minor planet catalog . , it has not been named. According to the established naming conventions, it will be named after one of the many centaurs from Greek mythology, which are creatures with the upper body of a human and the lower body and legs of a horse.

Physical characteristics

Diameter and albedo 

 has an absolute magnitude of 6.6. According to the Johnston's archive and astronomer Michael Brown, it measures 212 and 225 kilometers in diameter, based on an assumed albedo for the body's surface of 0.09 and 0.08, respectively. It is one of the largest centaurs, comparable in size with 2060 Chiron, 10199 Chariklo, and 54598 Bienor.

According to Brown,  is "possibly" a dwarf planet, which is the weakest of the 5 categories established by the astronomer. , no physical characteristics have been determined from photometric observations. The body's color, rotation period, pole and shape remain unknown.

See also

References

External links 
 List Of Centaurs and Scattered-Disk Objects, Minor Planet Center
 
 

523727
523727
523727
20100714